Winifred Langford Mantle (1911-1983) was an English writer of romantic novels and young adult fiction. She wrote under several pseudonyms, including Jan Blaine, Anne Fellowes, Frances Lang and Jane Langford.

Life
Winifred Langford Mantle was born on 15 February 1911 in Staffordshire, England. She was the daughter of Joseph Longford Mantle and Florence Fellows. She studied at Lady Margaret Hall, Oxford, gaining a BA in 1932.

Mantle died on 13 November 1983, in Wolverhampton, Staffordshire.

Works
 Happy is the House: a novel, 1951.
 (as Jane Langford) Haste to the Wedding. Mills & Boon, 1955. A shorter version was published serially in Woman's Weekly.
 The Secret Fairing, 1956.
 The Keys of Heaven,1958.
 The Hiding Place, 1962.
 The Leaping Lords, 1963
 Tinker's Castle, 1963.
 Country Cousin: a novel, 1963.
 Sandy Smith, 1963.
 The Château Holiday, 1964.
 The Question of the Painted Cave, 1965
 The Penderel Puzzle, 1966.
 Summer at Temple Quentin, 1967.
 The Admiral's Wood, 1967.
 The Penderel House, 1966.
 Winter at Wycliffe, 1968
 The Tower of Remicourt, 1971
 Jonnesty, 1973.
 The Inconvenient Marriage, 1974.
 Jonnesty in Winter, 1975.
 The Beckoning Maiden, 1976.
 The Vanishing Bridegroom, 1980.
 To Be a Fine Lady'', 1985.

References

External links
 Winifred Mantle at Fantastic Fiction

1911 births
1983 deaths
Romantic fiction novelists
Women romantic fiction writers
English romantic fiction writers
British writers of young adult literature
Women writers of young adult literature
People from Staffordshire
Alumni of Lady Margaret Hall, Oxford
20th-century pseudonymous writers
Pseudonymous women writers